The 2008-09 D1 Féminine was the 35th edition of the league since its re-establishment by the French Football Federation. The league began on 23 August 2008 and is slated to end on 7 June 2009.

League table
Note: A win in D1 Féminine is worth 4 points, with 2 points for a draw and 1 for a defeat.

Results

Stats

Top goalscorers

Source: StatsFootFeminin

References
D1 Féminine Official Website
D1 Féminine Standings and Statistics

Feminine, 2008-09
Division 1 Féminine seasons
1